The thirtieth series of the British medical drama television series Casualty commenced airing on BBC One in the United Kingdom on 29 August 2015, and concluded on 30 July 2016. The series consisted of 43 episodes, including the broadcast of the show's 1000th episode on 25 June 2016. Erika Hossington continued her role as series producer, while Oliver Kent continued his role as the show's executive producer. Seventeen cast members reprised their roles from the previous series with five actors, including three long-serving cast members, departing during this series. Chelsea Halfpenny appeared in the serial between September and November 2015 as F2 Alicia Munroe, reprising the role as a main cast member in July 2016. Alistair Brammer joined the cast for a four-month guest stint as receptionist Jack Diamond in December 2015. Three new regular cast members joined the serial in spring 2016: Lloyd Everitt as paramedic Jez Andrews; Jason Durr as staff nurse David Hide; and Jaye Griffiths as consultant Elle Gardner.

The opening two episodes of the series were written and directed by the show's co-creator, Paul Unwin. In addition to Unwin writing and directing the first two episodes, it was also revealed that he had contributed to one of the series major storylines, which saw brothers Cal and Ethan learn they were adopted. The series annual Christmas special episode received mixed criticism from journalist Matt Baylis, who was impressed that the show "still finds ways to reinvent itself" despite "going longer than the Nativity", however felt the episode was "slightly let down by the fine detail". Throughout the series, Hossington and Kent teased the show's build-up to the thirtieth anniversary episode, hinting that "something major" would happen to one of the "lead characters that will take them a very long time to recover from."

During series thirty, Casualty was awarded Best Drama at the Inside Soap Awards. In addition to this, the show was also shortlisted under the Best Drama category at the National Television Awards in 2016, however lost to rival Downton Abbey. On 14 February 2016, the BBC revealed that Casualty was the sixth most-loved programme on BBC iPlayer. The show was also nominated TV Soap of the Year at the 2016 Television and Radio Industries Club (TRIC) awards, however lost to rival soap EastEnders. Despite this, Casualty did receive the TRIC Special Award in special recognition of its thirtieth year on air in September 2016.

Production
Oliver Kent continued his role as Executive Producer, while Erika Hossington remained as Series Producer. This series consisted of 43 episodes. As the show built towards its thirtieth anniversary in 2016, Hossington revealed in an interview that the special episode will do something "no other show has done before." In the interview, Hossington said: "I'm very keen to make it a big event! We spoke about live episodes and things like that, but we decided that none of those things were satisfying as they've all been done. What we're doing, no other show has done before ..." Producer of Holby City, Simon Harper, also announced in an interview plans for a crossover event with sister show Holby City in celebration for Casualty's thirtieth anniversary. It was later revealed by Charles Venn in an interview with What's on TV on 8 June 2016, that his character, Nurse Jacob Masters, would be at the forefront of the anniversary episode. Venn said in the interview his character would play "an integral part" in the 110-minute special anniversary episode. Venn also went on to say that the cast and crew brand the thirtieth anniversary episode Casualty: The Movie.

In a more recent interview with Hossington, she revealed that the current ongoing storyline involving Ethan and Cal was pitched by co-creator Paul Unwin. The storyline saw Cal struggle to come to terms with the revelation that he and Ethan are adopted. This prompted Cal to go searching for his birth mother along with Charlie in episode sixteen where another secret was exposed when Cal found out his birth mother, Emilie Groome (Carol Royle) had Huntington's disease. The episode itself attracted an audience of 6.88 million viewers. 

Casualty aired one of its biggest storylines ever in the summer of 2016, as the show celebrated its thirtieth anniversary. August 2016 saw the show air 'an enormous stunt'. Hossington also revealed in an earlier interview in 2015 that, as part of the thirtieth anniversary, 'the hospital itself will be in jeopardy.' Kent commented on the storyline saying: 'We'll bring in some Holby characters, plus some other faces from the past and something major will happen to one of our lead characters that will take them a very long time to recover from — the ramifications will be felt in the ED for some time.' 

For a second series running, the revamped theme tune introduced back in January 2014 during Series 28 remained the same with the exception of episode two that saw the use of the first ever theme tune and title card, with the original 1986 theme tune playing over a montage of Series 1 and Series thirty characters. Albeit with the closing credits remaining the same. The titles are modified as characters arrive or depart throughout the course of the series.

Cast

Overview 
The thirtieth series of Casualty featured a cast of characters working in the fictitious emergency department of Holby City Hospital. The majority of the cast from the previous series continued to appear in this series. Amanda Mealing appeared as the clinical lead and a consultant in emergency medicine Connie Beauchamp, whilst Sunetra Sarker and William Beck appeared as consultants Zoe Hanna and Dylan Keogh. George Rainsford, Richard Winsor and Crystal Yu portrayed specialist registrars Ethan Hardy, Caleb "Cal" Knight and Lily Chao. Chloe Howman starred as clinical nurse manager Rita Freeman, whilst Derek Thompson continued his role of senior charge nurse and emergency nurse practitioner Charlie Fairhead. Charles Venn appeared as senior staff nurse and later clinical nurse manager Jacob Masters, whilst Lee Mead appeared as staff nurse, later senior staff nurse Ben "Lofty" Chiltern. Amanda Henderson starred as staff nurse Robyn Miller and Charles Dale appeared as healthcare assistant Mackenzie "Big Mac" Chalker. Jamie Davis appeared as porter Max Walker. Tony Marshall and Azuka Oforka portrayed receptionist Noel Garcia and Louise Tyler, the latter becoming a staff nurse early in the series. Jane Hazlegrove appeared as operational duty manager and paramedic Kathleen "Dixie" Dixon, whilst Michael Stevenson starred as Iain Dean. Chelsee Healey and Gregory Forsyth-Foreman also appeared as Honey Wright and Louis Fairhead in a recurring capacity.

Chelsea Halfpenny joined the cast as a foundation doctor undergoing the second year of foundation training, Alicia Munroe. She debuted on-screen in episode four, which was broadcast on 19 September 2015. She departed from the series in episode eleven, at the conclusion of a workplace bullying storyline. Halfpenny confirmed on 29 July 2016 that she would return as a regular cast member, commenting that she was "so excited and humbled". Alicia returned in the final episode of the series, broadcast on 30 July. Alistair Brammer made his first appearance in episode fourteen, broadcast on 5 December 2015, as receptionist Jack Diamond. Jack departed in episode thirty-two. Lloyd Everitt's casting in the role of paramedic Jez Andrews was announced in January 2016, with Kent describing him as "young, handsome and openly bisexual. Everitt said he was "honoured" to join "such a successful show". Jason Durr and Jaye Griffiths were also announced to be joining the regular cast on 24 February 2016, as staff nurse David Hide and consultant Elle Gardner. David was characterised as a "shy and socially awkward man", whilst Elle was described as "a little out of practise", but able to "work brilliantly". Of Jez, David and Elle, Kent said: "They will be taking on very different roles and will be embarking on their own brilliantly vibrant, bold and gripping stories each Saturday night. Jez arrived in episode twenty-seven, which aired on 12 March 2016, David in episode thirty-three, on 30 April 2016, and Elle in episode thirty-four, on 7 May 2016.

Louis Fairhead (Forsyth-Foreman) left the series in episode two, whilst Honey Wright (Healey) departed the show in episode four. Hazlegrove's decision to leave her role of Kathleen "Dixie" Dixon was announced in January 2016. Hazlegrove, who had appeared in the series for almost 10 years, left in episode twenty-one, broadcast on 30 January 2016. After two years in the role of Ben "Lofty" Chiltern, Mead chose to leave the show and Lofty departed in episode twenty-seven. Mead cited wanting to spend time with his daughter as his reasons for leaving. The break was originally credited as temporary, but Mead did not return and instead joined the cast of Holby City in 2017. Sarker departed from the show in episode thirty-four following nine years in the role of Zoe Hanna. Her exit had not been announced prior to transmission, surprising viewers. Sarker described her time on the show as "a privilege and a pleasure", before thanking cast, crew and the "wonderful fans". Kent commented that he "missed" Sarker on-set. Dale's decision to leave the series was announced on 7 June 2016, with his character Mackenzie "Big Mac" Chalker departing in episode thirty-eight at the conclusion of his drug addiction storyline. The show paid tribute to Dale with a montage of his time on the show, whilst Kent described Dale as "old school" following his exit. Howman departed from her role of Rita Freeman in episode forty-two after less than three years in the role. The show paid tribute to Howman in a montage video.

Cathy Shipton guest starred as original character Lisa "Duffy" Duffin in the two-part series opener. Her guest return was announced on 24 August 2015, with Shipton commenting, "I was surprised and delighted to be asked to recreate the role of 'Duffy' to launch the 30th series – especially as Paul Unwin, one of the original creators, was not only writing but also directing." Shipton's permanent return to the series was announced on 7 June 2016, with Kent commenting, "All of us at Casualty are incredibly excited that the fabulous Cathy Shipton has agreed to bring Duffy back to the Emergency Department." Duffy was confirmed to make a guest appearance in episode thirty-nine, the show's thousandth episode, before returning permanently in the following series. Mark Letheren made a guest appearance in episode four as counsellor Ben Harding, a role he has played on-off since 2007. Sarah Jayne Dunn, who appeared for five months in the previous series, made a cameo appearance in episode seven as Cal's ex-girlfriend Taylor Ashbie, before making a more prominent appearance in the red-button episode which followed the episode, entitled "On Call". Guy Henry, who appears regularly in Holby City as the hospital's chief executive officer Henrik Hanssen made three guest appearances throughout the series: episode nineteen, episode thirty-four, and episode thirty-five. Henry previously appeared in several episodes in 2011. Tom Chambers made two guest appearances as his Holby City character Sam Strachan in episodes twenty-three and twenty-four, whilst Emily Carey returned in the role of Grace Beauchamp in a storyline which reunited Sam with Connie, his former partner and Grace's mother. Rosie Marcel made a guest appearance as her Holby City character Jac Naylor in episode twenty-three.

Amy Noble made four guest appearances throughout the series as PC Kate Wilkinson. Kerry Bennett joined the cast in a recurring capacity as HART paramedic Jess Cranham in episode six, along with Anna Acton and Grace Doherty, who joined the cast as Jess's partner and daughter Nikki Chisom and Olivia Cranham in episode twelve, were part of a storyline which saw Dixie take "center stage". They were involved in a domestic abuse storyline which concluded in episode eighteen, broadcast on 9 January 2016, when a hostage situation and fire occurred leading to Nikki being arrested. Bennett and Doherty continued to appear in the series until episode twenty-one when they departed alongside Hazlegrove. The show's co-creator Paul Unwin pitched a storyline which saw Ethan and Cal discover they are adopted. Carol Royle was introduced as the brothers' biological mother Emilie Groome in episode sixteen. Her final appearance was made in episode twenty-seven, where she died at the seaside accompanied by Cal and Ethan. Hannah Spearritt joined the cast in a recurring capacity as Mercedes Christie, a drug addict that attacked Noel and later blackmailed Big Mac in a long-running storyline. She made her debut in episode twenty for one episode, and returned for more prominent appearances from episode twenty-four. Kelli Hollis joined the cast in episode twenty-four as Shelle Jones, Mercedes' drug dealer. Mercedes son and partner, Connor Christie and Vince Callaghan were introduced in episode twenty-eight, played by Toby Murray and Andrew Knott respectively. Connor departed in episode thirty-three, whilst Mercedes, Shelle and Vince made their final appearance in the following episode.

Joel Beckett returned to the series for two episodes as Rita's paedophile former husband Mark Richie in episodes thirty-one and thirty-three. Matthew Marsh and Vicky Hall reprised their roles as Dylan's father, Brian Carroll and his partner, Hazel Leyton in episode thirty-five. They continued to appear until episode forty-one. Sydney Wade and Tonicha Lawrence began appearing as Grace's friend Carmel Sims and her mother, Steph in episode thirty-six. They appeared in a storyline which saw Steph psychologically abuse Carmel and later, run Connie and Grace off the road in the end of series cliffhanger. Owain Arthur's casting in the role of Glen Thomas, a love interest for Robyn was announced in May 2016. He debuted in episode thirty-seven, and was involved in a storyline which saw him revealed to have a brain tumour.

Main characters 

 William Beck as Dylan Keogh
 Alistair Brammer as Jack Diamond
 Charles Dale as Big Mac
 Jamie Davis as Max Walker
 Jason Durr as David Hide
 Lloyd Everitt as Jez Andrews
 Jaye Griffiths as Elle Gardner
 Chelsea Halfpenny as Alicia Munroe
 
 Amanda Henderson as Robyn Miller
 Chloe Howman as Rita Freeman
 Tony Marshall as Noel Garcia
 Lee Mead as Ben "Lofty" Chiltern
 Amanda Mealing as Connie Beauchamp
 Azuka Oforka as Louise Tyler
 George Rainsford as Ethan Hardy
 Sunetra Sarker as Zoe Hanna
 Michael Stevenson as Iain Dean
 Derek Thompson as Charlie Fairhead
 Charles Venn as Jacob Masters
 Richard Winsor as Caleb Knight
 Crystal Yu as Lily Chao

Recurring characters 

 Owain Arthur as Glen Thomas
 Kerry Bennett as Jess Cranham
 Emily Carey as Grace Beauchamp
 Grace Doherty as Olivia Cranham
 
 Vicky Hall as Hazel Leyton
 Chelsee Healey as Honey Wright
 Guy Henry as Henrik Hanssen
 Matthew Marsh as Brian Caroll
 Hannah Spearritt as Mercedes Christie

Guest characters 

 Anna Acton as Nikki Chisom
 Joel Beckett as Mark Richie
 Tom Chambers as Sam Strachan
 Sarah Jayne Dunn as Taylor Ashbie
 Kelli Hollis as Shelle Jones
 Andrew Knott as Vince Callaghan
 Tonicha Lawrence as Steph Sims
 Mark Letheren as Ben Harding
 Rosie Marcel as Jac Naylor
 Toby Murray as Connor Christie
 Rukku Nahar as Rosa Sarwar
 Amy Noble as PC Kate Wilkinson
 Carol Royle as Emilie Groome
 Cathy Shipton as Lisa "Duffy" Duffin
 Sydney Wade as Carmel Sims

Episodes

Reception
It was announced on 5 October 2015, that Casualty won the award for Best Drama at the Inside Soap Awards, beating off competitors Waterloo Road and sister show Holby City. Upon winning the award, Kent commented: "Team Casualty was utterly delighted to win the Inside Soap Award last night. Massive thanks to everyone who voted us!". However, on 22 November 2015, Casualty lost out to rival Welsh series Pobol y Cwm which won the Soap round of Radio Times' 2015 TV Champion. Casualty received 33% of votes, while Pobol y Cwm received the remaining 67% of votes. 

After Casualty aired their annual Christmas special episode on 19 December 2015, journalist Matt Baylis wrote an article on The Sunday Express explaining that he thought the episode was "a fine seasonal appointment with the Casualty team, let down slightly by the fine detail." Baylis claimed that "Tiny things such as the time of day and the pointlessness of the question matter more than getting all the jargon right." He did praise the show as well, however, saying that despite "going longer than the Nativity" the show "still finds ways to reinvent itself."

On 5 January 2016, it was revealed that Casualty had been shortlisted for the NTA Best Drama Award. However the show lost to rival Downton Abbey. It faced competition from Broadchurch, Doctor Who and Downton Abbey. On 14 February 2016, it was revealed Casualty was the sixth most-loved programme on BBC iPlayer. The programme received more love than popular programmes Great British Bake Off, The Apprentice and even Sherlock. Casualty missed out on being shortlisted at this year's RTS Awards. The show won the Best Soap and Continuing Drama category at last year's awards. Casualty was nominated for TV Soap of the Year at the TRIC Awards 2016, however the show lost to rival EastEnders. Despite this, Casualty did receive the TRIC Special Award in special recognition for its thirtieth year on air in September 2016.

On 21 June 2016, Inside Soap Awards announced longlist nominations for the annual awards ceremony held in October. Amanda Mealing (Connie Beauchamp), Sunetra Sarker (Zoe Hanna), Derek Thompson (Charlie Fairhead) and Richard Windsor (Caleb Knight), were amongst those nominated in the Best Drama Star category, whilst Charlie's near-death experience, Connie & Jacob's romance and Ethan & Cal meeting their mother were amongst those nominated for Best Drama Storyline.

References

External links
 Casualty series 30 at BBC Online
 Casualty series 30 at the Internet Movie Database

30
2015 British television seasons
2016 British television seasons